Eusoffe Abdoolcader (11 September 1924– 11 January 1996)  was a Malaysian judge of the Federal Court from 1974 to 1988.  Eusoffe was a respected lawyer and Supreme Court judge, remembered by his peers and juniors as perhaps the greatest judge Malaysia had seen. Eusoffe was one of five senior judges suspended during the 1988 judicial crisis.

Education
At the age of 15, he passed his Senior Cambridge examinations with distinctions but he was too young to gain access to Raffles College in Singapore, which stipulated a minimum age of 17. He repeated his examinations and finally with his father's influence gained a seat in Raffles. He alleged that he was 'ragged' by Lee Kuan Yew.

Eusoffe read law at University College London, graduating with an LL.B. First Class Honours.

Legacy
As an advocate at the Bar, Abdoolcader was unsurpassed in his knowledge of the law and unmatchable in his advocacy, earning him a reputation as a formidable opponent. Lawyers and laymen alike were awed by his brilliance and his intellectual prowess, which he defused only by his dry sense of humour.

Personal life
His father, Sir Husein Hasanally Abdoolcader, was a prominent lawyer, community leader and politician. Husein was a member of the Straits Settlements' Legislative Council and a member of the Advisory Council to the Governor of the Malayan Union. Husein also made a name for himself in the Straits Settlement as the first Malayan Indian to be knighted by King George VI in 1948. Eusoffe was married to Haseenah.

Death
On 11 January 1996, following the death of his wife, Eusoffe committed suicide in his Taman Jesselton home.

Honours

 Companion of the Order of the Defender of the Realm (JMN) (1966)
 Commander of the Order of Loyalty to the Crown of Malaysia (PSM) - Tan Sri (1984)

 Companion of the Order of the Defender of State (DMPN) - Dato’

 Knight of the Order of Cura Si Manja Kini (DPCM) - Dato’ (1979)
 Knight Grand Commander of the Order of the Perak State Crown (SPMP) - Dato’ Seri (1986)

 Recipient of the Order of the Most Distinguished and Most Valiant Warrior (PYGP)

References

1924 births
1996 suicides
Malaysian people of Indian descent
Malaysian Muslims
20th-century Malaysian judges
Suicides by firearm
Companions of the Order of the Defender of the Realm
Commanders of the Order of Loyalty to the Crown of Malaysia